Shondra Summers-Armstrong (born 1964) is an American politician serving as a member of the Nevada Assembly from the 6th district. She assumed office on November 4, 2020.

Early life and education 
Summers-Armstrong was born in Richmond, California and graduated from California High School. She has also taken courses at the College of Southern Nevada.

Career 
After marrying her husband, Summers-Armstrong lived in Germany while he was serving in the United States Air Force. She and her husband had two sons and moved to Las Vegas before divorcing.

Summers-Armstrong has worked as a management analyst for the Regional Transportation Commission of Southern Nevada. She was also a board member of SEIU Nevada. Summers-Armstrong was elected to the Nevada Assembly in November 2020.

References

1964 births
Living people
Democratic Party members of the Nevada Assembly
21st-century American politicians
21st-century American women politicians